Cory Huclack (born February 29, 1984) is a former professional Canadian football linebacker who played for the Montreal Alouettes and Saskatchewan Roughriders of the Canadian Football League (CFL). He was signed by the Winnipeg Blue Bombers as an undrafted free agent in 2007.

Huclack played for the Manitoba Bisons from 2002-06. He finished his career in 2013 with 166 tackles (2nd all-time for Manitoba) and 10 interceptions (3rd all-time for Manitoba).  He was named a Canada West All-Star in 2005 when he had 5 interceptions.  In 2006, he was named a Canada West All-Star and a CIS Second Team All-Canadian.  He was also nominated for the Presidents Trophy as the CIS Defensive Player of the Year in 2006.

References

External links
Just Sports Stats
Saskatchewan Roughriders bio

1984 births
Living people
Canadian football people from Winnipeg
Players of Canadian football from Manitoba
Canadian football linebackers
Manitoba Bisons football players
Winnipeg Blue Bombers players
Montreal Alouettes players
Saskatchewan Roughriders players